JLA may refer to:

 JLA, a comic book series 1997–2006
 The Justice League of America, a fictional DC Comics superhero team
 JLA (company), a laundry equipment  provider
 Yugoslav People's Army